United Community was a credit union based in Western Australia and operated between 1972 and 2008. It later became part of Beyond Bank Australia.

It provided financial services to its members including savings and business accounts, term deposits, loans, insurance, financial planning and tax and accounting.

United Community (formerly United Credit Union) was established in 1972 as a financial co-operative.

In November 2008, United Credit Union merged with Community CPS Australia and carried on business in Western Australia under the registered business name United Community.

External links
Beyond Bank Australia

Credit unions of Australia